Angelis is the debut album from British Classical crossover singing group Angelis, released in the United Kingdom on the 6 November 2006. It reached number 2 in the official British music chart and sold over 350,000 copies and received platinum status. The group members received a platinum disc on GMTV.

Track listing
 "Angel" – 4:26
 "Pie Jesu" – 3:16
 "Somewhere over the Rainbow" – 3:36
 "Silent Night" – 2:13
 "Pokarekare Ana" – 2:36
 "Even Though You're Gone" – 4:11
 "Walking in the Air" – 3:51
 "Morning Has Broken" – 2:51
 "May It Be" – 3:50
 "Cantero" – 4:03
 "O, Holy Night" – 4:15

References

2006 debut albums